Dick's Picks Volume 28 is an album by the rock band the Grateful Dead.  Released on four CDs on April 20, 2003, it is the 28th installment of the Dick's Picks archival series. It was principally recorded February 26, 1973 at the Pershing Municipal Auditorium in Lincoln, Nebraska, and February 28, 1973 at the Salt Palace in Salt Lake City, Utah.

Contents 
Dick's Picks Volume 28 contains most of two concert performances from February 26 & 28, 1973. It includes two versions of "They Love Each Other", in its original arrangement, which featured an additional bridge. It also includes two versions of the Johnny Cash song, "Big River", which was played on both nights. Several other songs that were played both nights, but only one version of each is included, namely the February 26 version of "Promised Land" and the February 28 versions of "Beat it On Down the Line", "Mexicali Blues", "El Paso", "Box of Rain", "China Cat Sunflower", "I Know You Rider" & "Row Jimmy". Additional songs from February 26 are missing from the archival tapes.

The album cover continues the postage stamp theme begun with Dick's Picks Volume 26. Liner notes list vocalist/keyboardist Ron "Pigpen" McKernan as one of the band members "in spirit", as he had, at this time, been too ill to play with the band for eight months. He died, age 27, about a week after these concerts, on March 8, 1973.

Enclosure and article

The release includes three sheets of paper stapled together in the middle, yielding a twelve-page enclosure.  The front duplicates the cover of the CD and the back is a mostly blank, textured grey that matches the background of the front.

The first two pages inside the front cover contain a collage consisting of a Dead Heads Newsletter and a clipping of a short newspaper article.  The next two pages are a photomontage of black-and-white photographs of each of the band's members, and the middle two pages feature a large black-and-white photograph of the band playing on stage.  The next two pages contain another photomontage of black-and-white photographs of each of the band's members, and the last two pages list the contents of and credits for the release.

Article from the Salt Lake Tribune

The article on the third page of the enclosure is from the Salt Lake Tribune, was written by David Proctor on March 1, 1973, and is entitled "Rock show rolls 'em into the aisles".  Just five paragraphs long, it is a very positive review of the light show, the warm up band, which was The New Riders of the Purple Sage, and of course the main attraction, the concert by the Grateful Dead.

Caveat emptor
As with all releases in the Dick's Picks series, the notes also contain a "Caveat emptor", this time reading:

Track listing

February 26, 1973 – Pershing Municipal Auditorium, Lincoln, Nebraska
Disc 1
First set:
"The Promised Land" (Chuck Berry) – 3:36
"Loser" (Robert Hunter, Jerry Garcia) – 6:58
"Jack Straw" (Hunter, Bob Weir) – 5:17
"Don't Ease Me In" (traditional, arr. Grateful Dead) – 4:01
"Looks Like Rain" (John Barlow, Weir) – 7:24
"Loose Lucy" (Hunter, Garcia) – 7:04
"Beer Barrel Polka" (Lew Brown, Wladimir Timm, Jaromir Vejvoda, Vaclav Zeman) – 1:07
"Big Railroad Blues" (Noah Lewis) – 4:00
"Playing in the Band" (Hunter, Mickey Hart, Weir) – 17:23
Second set:
"They Love Each Other" (Hunter, Garcia) – 5:51
"Big River" (Johnny Cash) – 4:36
"Tennessee Jed" (Hunter, Garcia) – 8:03
Note

Disc 2
"Greatest Story Ever Told" (Hunter, Hart, Weir) – 5:26
"Dark Star" > (Hunter, Garcia, Hart, Bill Kreutzmann, Phil Lesh, Pigpen, Weir) – 25:23
"Eyes of the World" > (Hunter, Garcia) – 19:09
"Mississippi Half-Step Uptown Toodleloo" (Hunter, Garcia) – 8:00
"Me and My Uncle" (John Phillips) – 3:26
"Not Fade Away" > (Buddy Holly, Norman Petty) – 6:34
"Goin' Down the Road Feelin' Bad" > (trad., arr. Grateful Dead) – 7:52
"Not Fade Away" (Holly, Petty) – 3:02
Note

February 28, 1973 – Salt Palace, Salt Lake City, Utah
Disc 3
First set:
"Cold Rain and Snow" (trad., arr. Grateful Dead) – 6:30
"Beat it On Down the Line" (Jesse Fuller) – 3:23
"They Love Each Other" (Hunter, Garcia) – 5:54
"Mexicali Blues" (Barlow, Weir) – 4:03
"Sugaree" (Hunter, Garcia) – 8:03
"Box of Rain" (Hunter, Lesh) – 5:18
"El Paso" (Marty Robbins) – 4:42
"He's Gone" (Hunter, Garcia) – 12:06
"Jack Straw" (Hunter, Weir) – 4:48
Second set:
"China Cat Sunflower" > (Hunter, Garcia) – 7:20
"I Know You Rider" (trad., arr. Grateful Dead) – 5:46
"Big River" (Cash) – 4:26

Disc 4
"Row Jimmy" (Hunter, Garcia) – 8:27
"Truckin'" > (Hunter, Garcia, Lesh, Weir) – 12:02
"The Other One" > (Kreutzmann, Weir) – 15:07
"Eyes of the World" > (Hunter, Garcia) – 17:02
"Morning Dew" (Bonnie Dobson, Tim Rose) – 12:40
"Sugar Magnolia" (Hunter, Weir) – 9:11
"We Bid You Goodnight" (trad., arr. Grateful Dead) – 3:05
Note

Personnel

Grateful Dead
Jerry Garcia – guitar, vocals
Bob Weir – guitar, vocals
Phil Lesh – electric bass, vocals
Donna Godchaux – vocals
Keith Godchaux – piano
Bill Kreutzmann – drums
Pigpen – in spirit

Production
 Bill Candelario – recording
 Jeffrey Norman – CD mastering
 David Lemieux – tape archivist
 Robert Minkin – cover art and package design
 Brad Temkin – photography
 Rich Weiner – photography
 Ron sullivan – photography
 Mary Ann Mayer – Deadhead newsletter design

Notes

28
2003 live albums